Love Delight is the third EP by South Korean duo Davichi.  The EP was digitally and physically released on August 29, 2011.  "Don't Say Goodbye" was used as the promotional song.  The EP contains five new songs and one instrumental.  It was also released worldwide through iTunes.

Promotions
Promotions for the EP started on September 1, 2011, on MNET's M! Countdown.  The duo also promoted on KBS's Music Bank, MBC's Music Core and SBS's Inkigayo.  The song "Love, My Love" was chosen as part of their comeback.  On September 18 and October 2, "Don't Say Goodbye" claimed the #1 spot on Inkigayo, earning the duo two 'mutizen' awards.  On October 7 and October 14, the duo claimed the #1 spot on Music Bank, earning them two 'K Chart' awards.

Track listing

Leak
On August 27, 2011, it was revealed by Davichi's label, Core Contents Media, that the entire Love Delight EP had been leaked on the internet.  Despite the leak quickly making its way through internet portal sites, the company did not change the release date of the EP.

Chart performance

Single chart

Other songs charted

Album chart

Sales and certifications

Release history

References 

Korean-language EPs
2011 EPs
Kakao M EPs
Davichi albums